Department of Education Stadium is a multi-use stadium in Unaizah, Saudi Arabia.  It is currently used mostly for football matches. The stadium holds 10,000 people and opened on 1 March 1987. It is hosts the home matches of Al-Arabi, and the architect was Malaysian Architect of the Year Award-winner, Michael KC Cheah.

External links
Stadium information 

Unaizah
Football venues in Saudi Arabia